KIG may refer to either one of these things:

 Kig (software), a geometry software
 Kent International Gateway, a proposed rail-freight interchange in Kent, England
 ISO 639:kig or Kimaghama, a language spoken on Yos Sudarso Island in Papua province, Indonesia
 Animegao kigurumi, a type of cosplay
 Kwanza Infrastructure Group, a developer of renewable energy generation projects in Uganda, East Africa

See also
 Keig, a village in Aberdeenshire, Scotland